Hamza Ngoto (born September 13, 1990) is a French Muay Thai kickboxer who won the WBC Muay Thai super middleweight title in 2018.

Muay thai career
Ngoto participated in the 2016 MAX Muay Thai tournament. He defeated Islam Murtazaev by decision in the semifinals, and Adrien Rubis by decision in the finals.

In August of 2018, Ngoto fought Thongchai Sitsongpeenong for the WBC Muaythai super middleweight title. He won by a second round elbow KO.

Ngoto was scheduled to fight Toby Smith for the Lion Fight light heavyweight title, during Lion Fight 52. He defeated Smith by a split decision.

After winning the Lion Fight title, he was set to fight Gaëtan Dambo during Golden Fight. Ngoto won the fight by unanimous decision.

He defended his WBC Muaythai title for the first time in February 2020, when he was scheduled to fight Salimkhan Ibragimov. Ngoto won the fight by decision.

Ngoto was scheduled to face Mikael Benatar at Muay Thai Grand Prix on December 5, 2021.

Titles and accomplishments
 2019 Lion Fight Light Heavyweight World Champion (76 kg / 168 lb)
 2018 WBC Muay Thai World Super Middleweight Champion (76.2 kg / 168 lb)  
 2016 MAX Muay Thai Champion (75 kg / 165 lb)  
 2015 IFMA World Muay Thai Championships (75 kg)  
 2014 IFMA World Muay Thai Championships B-class (75 kg)

Fight record

|-  style="background:#;"
| 2023-03-17 ||  ||align=left| Adolfo Barão || Muay Thai Grand Prix || Paris, France || ||  || 
|-  style="background:#CCFFCC;"
| 2021-12-05 || Win ||align=left| Mikael Benatar || Muay Thai Grand Prix || Paris, France || TKO (Referee Stoppage) || 3 || 3:00 
|-  style="background:#CCFFCC;"
| 2020-02-23 || Win ||align=left| Salimkhan Ibragimov || Authentic Mix Martial Arts || Phuket, Thailand || Decision || 5 ||3:00 
|-
! style=background:white colspan=9 |
|-  style="background:#CCFFCC;"
| 2019-12-14|| Win ||align=left| Gaëtan Dambo || Golden Fight || Paris, France || Decision (Unanimous) || 5 || 3:00
|-  style="background:#CCFFCC;"
| 2019-03-16 || Win ||align=left| Toby Smith || Lion Fight 52 Dublin || Dublin, Ireland ||Decision (split) || 5 || 3:00 
|-
! style=background:white colspan=9 |
|-  style="background:#CCFFCC;"
| 2018-11-09 || Loss ||align=left| Rungrawee Kemmuaythaigym || Best of Siam 14 || Paris, France ||Decision  || 5 || 3:00
|-  style="background:#CCFFCC;"
| 2018-08-23|| Win||align=left| Thongchai Sitsongpeenong || Rajadamnern Stadium || Bangkok, Thailand || KO (Elbow) || 2 || 2:35
|-
! style=background:white colspan=9 |
|-  style="background:#CCFFCC;"
| 2018-05-05 || Win ||align=left| Chanchai Sititisukato || Warriors Night || Paris, France || Decision|| 5 || 3:00
|-  style="background:#CCFFCC;"
| 2018-04-14|| Win ||align=left| Singsamuang Kiatchansing || EFC Ultimate Fight Night || Lons-le-Saunier, France || KO || 1 ||
|-  style="background:#CCFFCC;"
| 2017-11-17 || Win ||align=left| Jimmy Vienot || Warriors Night || Paris, France || Decision || 5 || 3:00
|-  style="background:#CCFFCC;"
| 2017-05-20 || Win||align=left| Johane Beausejour || Capital Fights 2 ||  Paris, France || Decision || 5 || 3:00
|-  style="background:#CCFFCC;"
| 2017-04-08 || Win ||align=left| Tengnueng Sitjaesairoong || THAI FIGHT Paris || Paris, France || Decision || 3 || 3:00
|-  style="background:#CCFFCC;"
| 2016-11-19 || Win ||align=left| Diogo Calado || Radikal Fight Night Gold || France || Decision  ||5  ||3:00
|-  style="background:#FFBBBB;"
| 2016-07-10 || Loss ||align=left| Thomas Carpenter || MAX Muay Thai || Pattaya, Thailand || Decision ||3  ||3:00
|-  style="background:#CCFFCC;"
| 2016-04-01 || Win ||align=left| Wendy Annonay || ShowThai 14 ||  Paris, France || TKO ||3  ||
|-  style="background:#CCFFCC;"
| 2016-01-17 || Win||align=left| Adrien Rubis || MAX Muay Thai ||  Pattaya, Thailand || Decision ||3  || 3:00
|-  style="background:#CCFFCC;"
| 2016-01-17 || Win||align=left| Islam Murtazaev || MAX Muay Thai ||  Pattaya, Thailand || Decision  ||3  || 3:00
|-  style="background:#CCFFCC;"
| 2015-10-31 || Win ||align=left| James Benal || ShowThai 13 ||  Paris, France || Decision  ||5  || 3:00
|-  style="background:#CCFFCC;"
| 2015-06-06 || Win ||align=left| Mehmet Kaya || Challenge Cup Muay Thai Elite WMC ||  Orléans, France || TKO  ||2  ||
|-
| colspan=9 | Legend:    

|- style="background:#cfc;"
| 2015-08-23|| Win||align=left| Islam Murtazaev || 2015 IFMA World Championship, Final || Bangkok, Thailand || Decision || 3 || 3:00
|-
! style=background:white colspan=9 |
|- style="background:#cfc;"
| 2015-08-|| Win||align=left| Surichay Pattanaphong || 2015 IFMA World Championship, Semi Final || Bangkok, Thailand || TKO (Elbow)|| 2 || 

|- style="background:#cfc;"
| 2015-08-|| Win||align=left| Vadim Loparev || 2015 IFMA World Championship, Quarter Final || Bangkok, Thailand || Decision || 3 ||3:00 

|- style="background:#cfc;"
| 2015-08-|| Win||align=left| Dogan Ali|| 2015 IFMA World Championship, Round of 16 || Bangkok, Thailand || Decision || 3 ||3:00

|- style="background:#cfc;"
| 2014-05-|| Win||align=left| Sergio Mazzetti || 2014 IFMA World Championship, Final || Langkawi, Malaysia || ||  || 
|-
! style=background:white colspan=9 |

|- style="background:#cfc;"
| 2014-05-|| Win||align=left| Jacob Mackenzie || 2014 IFMA World Championship, Semi Final || Langkawi, Malaysia || ||  || 

|- style="background:#cfc;"
| 2014-05-|| Win||align=left| Vadim Loparev || 2014 IFMA World Championship, Quarter Final || Langkawi, Malaysia || ||  || 

|- style="background:#cfc;"
| 2014-05-|| Win||align=left| Sabio Matina Qulla || 2014 IFMA World Championship, Second round || Langkawi, Malaysia || ||  || 

|- style="background:#cfc;"
| 2014-05-|| Win||align=left| Frederik Winter || 2014 IFMA World Championship, First round || Langkawi, Malaysia || ||  || 
|-
| colspan=9 | Legend:

See also
List of male kickboxers
List of WBC Muaythai world champions

References 

French male kickboxers
French Muay Thai practitioners
Middleweight kickboxers
Living people
1990 births
Black French sportspeople